The Almon A. Covey House is a historic house in northeastern Salt Lake City, Utah, United States, that is located within the University Neighborhood Historic District, but is individually listed on the National Register of Historic Places (NRHP).

Description
The house is located at 1211 East 100 South. It is a -story, Prairie School-style house, designed by architecture firm Ware & Treganza. Construction commenced in 1909. According to the NRHP nomination, it is significant as a "fine example" of Prairie School style in Utah. It is probably one of the earliest examples of Prairie School style in the work of Ware & Treganza.

Construction of the Hyrum T. Covey House (next door, at 1229 East 100 South) also began in 1909. It was also built in Prairie School style, designed by the same firm, and is also NRHP-listed.

The house was listed on the NRHP on October 3, 1980.

See also

 National Register of Historic Places listings in Salt Lake City

References

External links

Houses on the National Register of Historic Places in Utah
National Register of Historic Places in Salt Lake City
Prairie School architecture in Utah
Houses completed in 1909
Houses in Salt Lake City
1909 establishments in Utah